Song of Love is a 1929 American pre-Code musical film directed by Erle C. Kenton and starring Belle Baker and Ralph Graves. It was released by Columbia Pictures on November 13, 1929. The film was the film debut of Belle Baker. The film contained songs but was also issued in a silent version. Actress Eve Arden made her film debut in the film, appearing under her real name, Eunice Quedens.

Premise
The story of a show business family called the Gibsons. Ma Gibson (Baker) realizes their lifestyle is affecting their child and breaks up the act.

Cast
 Belle Baker as Anna Gibson
 Ralph Graves as Tom Gibson
 Eve Arden as Maisie LeRoy (credited as Eunice Quedens)
 Arthur Housman as Joe Sweeney, Acrobat
 Charles C. Wilson as Traveling Salesman (credited as Charles Wilson)
 Maurice Black as Tony Giuseppe (uncredited)
 Dannie Mac Grant as Little Boy (uncredited)
 Douglas Greer as Freckle-Faced Boy (uncredited)
 William Irving as Stage Manager (uncredited)
 Eddie Kane as Max Goldman (uncredited)
 Kane Richmond as Nightclub Patron (uncredited)

References

External links

 
 
 
 
 Song of Love (1929) as silentera.com

1929 films
American black-and-white films
1929 musical films
Columbia Pictures films
American musical films
Films produced by Edward Small
1920s English-language films
Films directed by Erle C. Kenton
1920s American films